Mollem is a village in the municipality of Asse, Flemish Brabant, Belgium.
It used to be a town on its own but now is a part of Asse.

Mollem has a railway station on line 60 between Jette and Dendermonde.

The hamlet of Bollebeek is close to the village.

Mollem's most famous place must be "Rie van Pol", a bar that has remained unchanged throughout the years.
Every year a lot of visitors (mostly foreign) visit Mollem just to visit this place.

Populated places in Flemish Brabant